William "Bill" G. Leavitt (October 4, 1926 – November 4, 1990) was an American jazz guitarist and arranger best known for his long series of guitar instruction books and for developing a related curriculum at Berklee College of Music as chair of the guitar department.

Method books
Leavitt's books contain no guitar tablature and consist only of standard notation and chord symbols with occasionally written-in fingering numbers, string numbers, and position numerals.  They range in level from the beginning reader to the professional.

Emphasis is placed on using a guitar pick, rather than a fingerstyle approach.  At the time, although many players were using picks, very few college-level educational materials existed that were specifically designed with the pick-style in mind.

With the exception of Classical Studies for Pick-Style Guitar, all of Leavitt's published studies are originals.  This differs from many method books that include "old favorites."  Leavitt emphasizes that when learning how to read music, students must be presented with music they don't already know.

Books 
 A Modern Method for Guitar Volume 1 (Berklee Press)
 A Modern Method for Guitar Volume 2 (Berklee Press)
 A Modern Method for Guitar Volume 3 (Berklee Press)
 Berklee Basic Guitar - Phase 1 (Berklee Press)
 Berklee Basic Guitar - Phase 2 (Berklee Press)
 Melodic Rhythms for Guitar (Berklee Press)
 Reading Studies for Guitar (Berklee Press)
 Advanced Reading Studies for Guitar (Berklee Press)
 Classical Studies for Pick-Style Guitar (Berklee Press)

References

External links
 Satin Doll by student turned professor, Jon Finn, on Leavitt's teaching style
 Charles H. Chapman Tribute Biography

1990 deaths
1926 births
American jazz guitarists
20th-century guitarists